Aberdeen railway station is located on the Main Northern line in New South Wales, Australia. It serves the town of Aberdeen.

History
Aberdeen opened on 20 August 1870. In 2010, the station was refurbished, with a new shelter and retaining walls built.

Platforms & services
The station has one platform and a passing loop. It is serviced by NSW TrainLink Hunter Line services travelling between Newcastle and Scone.

There are three services in each direction on weekdays, with two on weekends and public holidays.
 
It is also served by NSW TrainLink Xplorer services from Sydney to Armidale and Moree. This station is a request stop for the service, so the train only stops here if passengers have booked to board/alight here.

References

External links

Aberdeen station details Transport for New South Wales

Easy Access railway stations in New South Wales
Railway stations in the Hunter Region
Railway stations in Australia opened in 1870
Regional railway stations in New South Wales
Main North railway line, New South Wales